The American Idols Live! Tour 2012 is a summer concert tour in the United States, Canada and Philippines that features the Top 10 contestants of the 11th season of American Idol.  The tour began on July 6, 2012 in Detroit, Michigan and ended on September 21, 2012 in Quezon City, Philippines.

Like the 2011 summer tour, this is the second time to include the Philippines at the same venue in Quezon City, marking this the third time that the tour took place outside North America.

Performers

Overview
The tour this repeated the same format as American Idols Live! Tour 2011, where there were solos and group performances. The first half contained solos from the first five contestants eliminated: Erika Van Pelt, Heejun Han, Deandre Brackensick, Colton Dixon and Elise Testone. The second half started with a set for the runner-up, Jessica Sanchez, then there were performances by Skylar Laine, Hollie Cavanagh and Joshua Ledet, and then a set for the winner, Phillip Phillips. The show ended with a group number.

Unlike previous tours, the stage was placed in the middle of an arena to make it look like a theater environment.

Setlist

 Top 10 (except Phillips) – "Sing" (My Chemical Romance)
 DeAndre Brackensick – "Master Blaster (Jammin')" (Stevie Wonder)
 Hollie Cavanagh and Skylar Laine – "Undo It" (Carrie Underwood)
 Erika Van Pelt – "Glitter in the Air" (Pink)
 Van Pelt, Cavanagh, Joshua Ledet and Colton Dixon – "Moves like Jagger" (Maroon 5 feat. Christina Aguilera)
 Heejun Han – "Green Light" (John Legend)
 Han, Brackensick and Jessica Sanchez – "Party Rock Anthem" (LMFAO)
 Ledet, Dixon, Brackensick and Han – "Everybody Talks" (Neon Trees)
 Elise Testone – "Whole Lotta Love" (Led Zeppelin), "Rumour Has It" (with Brackensick and Van Pelt on backing vocals) (Adele)
 Dixon – "Meant to Live" (Switchfoot), "Never Gone" (Colton Dixon) and "Piano Man" (Billy Joel)
 Top 10 (except Phillips)– "Just the Way You Are"/"What Makes You Beautiful" (Bruno Mars/One Direction)

Intermission
 Sanchez – "Best Thing I Never Had" (Beyoncé), "How Come U Don't Call Me Anymore?" (with Ledet and Brackensick on backing vocals) (Prince) and "Proud Mary" (with Ledet and Brackensick on backing vocals) (Creedence Clearwater Revival)
 Laine – "Gunpowder & Lead"  (Miranda Lambert) and "Stay with Me"  (Faces)
 Cavanagh – "Rolling in the Deep" (with Testone and Van Pelt on backing vocals) (Adele) and "Give Your Heart a Break" (Demi Lovato)
 Ledet "Runaway Baby" (with Testone, Brakensick and Van Pelt on backing vocals) (Bruno Mars) and "It's a Man's Man's Man's World" (James Brown)
 Ledet and Sanchez – "I Knew You Were Waiting (For Me)" (George Michael and Aretha Franklin)
 Phillip Phillips – "Superstition" (Stevie Wonder) and "Nice & Slow" (Usher)
 Phillips and Testone – "Somebody That I Used to Know" (Gotye feat. Kimbra)
 Phillips (with Sanchez on backing vocal) – "Volcano" (Damien Rice)
 Phillips (with Dixon and Brackensick on backing vocals) – "Home" (Phillip Phillips)
 Sanchez, Cavanagh, Laine, Testone and Van Pelt – "Raise Your Glass" (Pink)
 All Top 10 – "Glad You Came" (The Wanted)

Tour dates

Revenue
The tour was ranked No. 62 in the list of 2012 Year-end Top 200 North American tours, based on total gross income .

Tour summary
 Number of shows – 46 (3 sold out)
 Total gross – $14,413,023 (45 shows)
 Total attendance – 252,703
 Average attendance – 5,616 (84.2%)
 Average ticket price – $57.04
 Highest gross – Lafayette, Louisiana – $481,581
 Lowest gross – Syracuse, New York – $160,018
 Highest attendance – Lafayette, Louisiana – 9,226 (100%)
 Lowest attendance – Syracuse, New York – 2,712 (61%)

References

American Idol concert tours
2012 concert tours